Owston's chimaera, Chimaera owstoni, is a species of fish in the family Chimaeridae endemic to Japan. Its natural habitat is open seas.

References

Fish of Japan
Chimaera
Fish described in 1905
Taxonomy articles created by Polbot